City of Derry Airport , previously known as RAF Eglinton and Londonderry Eglinton Airport, is a regional airport located  northeast of Derry, Northern Ireland.

The airport, also known locally as Eglinton Airport, has experienced a decline in passenger numbers in recent years. In 2022, 163,130 passengers used the airport, having peaked at 438,996 in 2008. Loganair and Ryanair both serve the airport on domestic routes to England and Scotland, and AlbaStar serves the airport with an international service to Spain.

History

1945–1989

The airport has its origins in the Second World War. In 1941, the Royal Air Force (RAF) Eglinton air base was established as the home to No. 133 Squadron RAF which flew Hawker Hurricanes in defence of the city. In 1942 the base was occupied by No. 41 Squadron RAF. In 1943 the airfield became a Fleet Air Arm base called RNAS Eglinton (HMS Gannet) and was home to No. 1847 Fleet Air Arm Squadron which provided convoy air cover as part of the Battle of the Atlantic.  RNAS Eglinton closed in April 1959 with the remaining squadrons moving to RAF Ballyhalbert, Co. Down and RAF Ballykelly, Co. Londonderry.

After the war, the base remained a military establishment until the 1950s when the Ministry of Defence returned much of the land to the original landowners. The original name of the airport was Londonderry Eglinton Airport and it was usually just referred to as "Eglinton". Some limited commercial activities were undertaken at the airfield during the 1960s when Emerald Airways operated a service to Glasgow. Emerald built a new terminal building and control tower to support services with the first flight to Glasgow operating on 16 September 1967. During most of the 1970s, the only flying at Eglinton was carried out by Eglinton Flying Club which is still based at the airport. In 1978 Londonderry City Council decided to purchase the airfield with a view to improving the transport infrastructure for the northwest of Ireland. The airport has slowly developed since then with private short-haul charters to various destinations within the British Isles, a service which still continues including the recent addition of helicopter pilot training and charter services. Loganair introduced the first scheduled flight between Derry and Glasgow in 1979, a route which was dropped due to rising fuel costs. This route was the only route for ten years until Loganair introduced an additional daily Manchester service in 1989.

1989–2006
A major redevelopment programme was undertaken by the council from 1989 to 1993 with grant aid from the European Regional Development Fund. £10.5 million was spent upgrading all of the facilities at the airport including runways, taxiways, access roads, navigation equipment, and runway lighting, as well as a new purpose-built terminal and fire station. The new terminal was officially opened in March 1994. The name of the airport was officially changed from Londonderry Eglinton to the City of Derry Airport by Derry City Council following nationalist support within the newly renamed council. However, as of May 2014, the Aeronautical Information Publication published by the UK's air navigation service provider, National Air Traffic Services, still shows Londonderry/Eglinton. At that time there were still only two scheduled routes carrying about 40,000 passengers each year. 1995 saw the arrival of Jersey European Airways who attempted to operate a short-lived shuttle link between Derry and Belfast City Airport.

During 1998 and 1999 safety improvements were undertaken at the airport as a matter of priority. As the airport served Northern Ireland and Donegal in the Republic of Ireland, funding was sourced and thereafter provided by the Irish Government in addition to that provided by the British Government and Derry City Council. These improvements meant that larger aircraft could use the airport, thus, Air 2000 started holiday charter flights, on behalf of Falcon Holidays, in May 1999, followed in July by Ryanair who operated scheduled flights. The Ryanair service to London Stansted grew substantially and the Loganair routes continued to operate until October 2008 as a British Airways franchise, including a sector to Dublin, initiated as a public service obligation route, subsidised by the Irish Government. Soaring fuel costs saw all British Airways operations to Northern Ireland suspended. British Airways has since returned to Northern Ireland by buying British Midland Airways (bmi) and continuing operating the route to London Heathrow Airport from George Best Belfast City Airport.

Aer Arann operated services to Manchester and Birmingham for a short time.

2006–2011
In May 2006, the European Commission gave its approval for the British and Irish governments to invest €15 million in the airport. Although this work did not include the lengthening of the single serviceable runway, it included the expansion of the safety zones at each end which would allow jets to land and take off with full passenger capacities. Operators of Boeing 737 jets were previously limited to 80% capacity as a safety feature due to the short length of the runway. Other works included the expansion of the apron immediately in front of the control tower which would allow for the parking of several aircraft at any one time. As a prelude to the expansion at the airport several families were removed from their homes under a Government Compulsory Purchase scheme before the buildings and outbuildings were demolished.

The decrease in operational hours at the airport as a direct consequence of the challenging economic conditions have caused problems for Eglinton Flying Club and the helicopter flight training facility, who in turn have threatened to leave the airport if the decisions are not reversed. They have claimed that this would cost the airport some £250,000 in annual revenue while the owners, Derry City Council, have countered that the decrease in operational hours was necessary as part of the implementation of the £600,000 budget reduction plan.

In January 2009, the council appointed Albert Harrison, the former head of Belfast International Airport, as the new manager of the airport. He had been tasked with turning the loss-making facility around and has been given just six months to implement savings of £600,000 per annum and increase the number of carriers, destinations, and passengers.

The recently completed runway safety zone extension and apron works have allowed the CAA to lift the capacity restriction on aircraft operating out of the airport. This has increased seat availability and passenger throughput at the airport. It also enabled Ryanair to establish their first international route from the airport to Alicante.

In April 2009 the council issued tender documents for a multimillion-pound expansion of the terminal to improve passenger flow and meet current EU customs and immigration regulations. The arrivals hall has recently been improved and tax free shopping, WHSmith and the Amelia Earhart Business lounge in the departure area are open during operational hours.

On 9 October 2009, Derry City Council who own and operate the airport began the process which will lead to the privatisation of the facility. Initially, a holding company will be set up by the council which will own 100% of the shares, thereafter the council intends to do market research to seek the level of interest in private sector investors. As part of the privatisation plan two subsidiaries will be formed that will operate the airport and manage the estate.

In June 2010 it was announced that the Airport was in the final stages of discussion with the Balfour Beatty Group about a management contract, with the objective of bringing additional commercial experience and resources to the Airport for the economic benefit of the region and to reduce the subvention from the City Council.

The Belfast to Derry single-track railway line of Northern Ireland Railways passes close to but not across the tip of the runway at the North Eastern end. Because it is in the Runway End Safety Area, safety systems ensure that no train can pass when aircraft are taking off or landing.

2011–present

Ryanair axed its services to Alicante and Birmingham in 2014, followed by its service to Faro in 2016. In 2017, Ryanair axed its daily service to London Stansted. In response, the airport submitted a public service obligation request to the Department for Transport. The Northern Ireland Executive also agreed a multimillion-pound funding package for the airport. Flybmi commenced operations on the Stansted route in 2017, with 13 weekly flights. These flights operated up until February 2019, when Flybmi ceased operations.

In October 2018, Ryanair replaced its Derry to Glasgow route with a new route to Edinburgh. Following this decision, Loganair resumed operations to Glasgow, having previously operated the route between 1979 and 2007. In 2019 following flybmi's collapse Loganair announced they would be taking on the route while adding a new service to Manchester.

In December 2020, Ryanair was forced to axe all of their flights from the UK to non-EU destinations (including UK Domestic routes) due to a row with the Civil Aviation Authority (United Kingdom). The CAA required that post-Brexit, all flights originating from the United Kingdom to non-EU-based destinations for airlines with a base airport in the United Kingdom  use aircraft with a UK registration (Eg: G-ABCD). Due to this, Ryanair decided to axe these routes saying "The decision to cancel these flights was taken by Ryanair alone. We will continue to engage with the airline on these matters as we seek to act in the best interest of consumers".. The UK regional airline Loganair will launch a route to Liverpool (Ryanair operated from Derry to Liverpool & Edinburgh), replacing the lost Ryanair route, beginning 24 May 2021. In October 2021 Ryanair announced their return to the airport with a new service to Manchester operating three times a week, which commenced at the beginning of December 2021. Loganair also announced a new route in late October to Edinburgh, this service would launch on the 17th of May 2022, and operatef thrice weekly, increasing to five times weekly in the summer.

Loganair announced the termination of the Edinburgh-City of Derry route in November 2022, with the final flight taking place on the 3rd of January 2023. In response, the Glasgow-City of Derry service will operate with increased frequency.

Ski packages for local schools will be launching from the airport in 2024.

Airlines and destinations

The following airlines operate regular scheduled and charter flights to and from Derry:

Statistics

Accidents and incidents
On 24 May 2007, the airport was closed by Civil Aviation Authority following an inspection. Four days later, after reinspection, the CAA allowed the airport to be reopened. Changes made to the airport included placing nets over culverts and ponds nearby, repairs to the aircraft parking apron, and minor drainage work carried out on the runway. All cancelled airlines, including British Airways and Ryanair subsequently resumed full services.

Notes
[a]. Londonderry City Council became Derry City Council in 1984.

References

External links

 Official website

Airports in Northern Ireland
Transport in County Londonderry
Buildings and structures in County Londonderry